Bopha Kong (25 April 1981), is a Vietnamese-born French parataekwondo practitioner. He will compete at the 2020 Summer Paralympics in the 61 kg category, having qualified via World Ranking.

References

1981 births
Living people
French male taekwondo practitioners
Taekwondo practitioners at the 2020 Summer Paralympics
French people of Vietnamese descent
French sportspeople of Asian descent
Sportspeople of Vietnamese descent
Naturalized citizens of France